Lesmone griseipennis, the gray-winged owlet, is a species of moth in the family Erebidae.

The MONA or Hodges number for Lesmone griseipennis is 8654.

References

Further reading

 
 
 

Omopterini
Articles created by Qbugbot
Moths described in 1882